The Warm Springs River is a tributary of the Deschutes River in north-central Oregon in the United States. It flows generally southeast along the east side of the Cascade Range. The watershed is approximately between Mount Jefferson and Timothy Lake, and the northwestern and southwestern boundaries of the Warm Springs Indian Reservation coincide with the watershed. The river flows generally eastward, with occasional diagonals southeast or northeast. It joins the Deschutes River at river mile 83.7 (134.7 km upstream from the mouth of the Deschutes).

Named tributaries of the river from source to mouth are Dry and Bunchgrass creeks followed by the South Fork Warm Springs River. Then come Badger, Mill, and Beaver creeks.

See also
 List of rivers of Oregon

References

External links
"Instream Flow Study of the Warm Springs River" (PDF) from the Bonneville Power Administration, published in September 1981

Rivers of Oregon
Rivers of Wasco County, Oregon